Fedorkovo is a rural locality (a village) in Komyanovskoye Rural Settlement, Gryazovetsky District, Vologda Oblast, Russia. The population was 2 as of 2002.

Geography 
Fedorkovo is located 23 km north of Gryazovets (the district's administrative centre) by road. Maloye Kostino is the nearest rural locality.

References 

Rural localities in Gryazovetsky District